Felimidh Ó Corcrán (d. 1522) was an Irish Doctor of Canon Law.

Ó Corcrán was a member of a Brehon family from County Fermanagh. The Annals of the Four Masters record his death, sub anno 1522:

 Master Felim O'Corcran, a learned doctor of the canon law, died.

See also

 Brian Ó Corcrán
 Fláithrí Ó Corcrán
 Cahalan Ó Corcrán

References
 http://www.ucc.ie/celt/published/T100005D/
 http://www.irishtimes.com/ancestor/surname/index.cfm?fuseaction=Go.&UserID=

Canon law jurists
16th-century Irish people
People from County Fermanagh